Soul Vaccination: Tower of Power Live is the second live album by the soul/funk group Tower of Power. It was recorded live in California during their 1998 world tour at two venues: The Fillmore in San Francisco and the Fox Theatre in Stockton.

Track listing 
All tracks composed by Emilio Castillo and Stephen Kupka
 "Soul with a Capital 'S'" - 5:04
 "I Like Your Style" (Castillo, Kupka, Nick Milo) - 3:42
 "Soul Vaccination" - 4:56
 "Down to the Night Club (Bump City)" (Castillo, Kupka, David Garibaldi) - 3:14
 "Willing to Learn" - 6:06
 "Souled Out" (Castillo, Kupka, Marlon McClain) - 4:58
 "Diggin' on James Brown" (Castillo, Kupka, Ken Kessie) - 4:53
 "(To Say the Least) You're the Most" (Johnny Guitar Watson, Larry Williams) - 4:33
 "You Strike My Main Nerve" (Castillo, Kupka, Lenny Williams, Louis Gordon) - 3:55
 "Can't You See (Your Doin' Me Wrong)" (Castillo, Kupka, Lenny Williams) - 3:26
 "You Got to Funkifize" - 4:46
 "So Very Hard to Go" - 3:49
 "What Is Hip?" (Castillo, Kupka, David Garibaldi) - 6:01
 "You're Still a Young Man" - 5:59
 "So I Got to Groove" (Castillo, Kupka, Herman Matthews) - 6:08
 "Way Down To The Ground" - 4:35

Personnel 
Tower of Power
 Brent Carter – lead vocals (1, 2, 3, 5, 6, 8, 9, 10, 12-15)
 Nick Milo – keyboards, backing vocals 
 Jeff Tamelier – guitars, backing vocals, co-lead vocals (4)
 Francis Rocco Prestia – bass
 David Garibaldi – drums 
 Stephen "Doc" Kupka – baritone saxophone 
 Norbert Stachel – lead tenor saxophone, all tenor sax solos
 Emilio Castillo – tenor saxophone, backing vocals, lead vocals (4, 7, 11)
 Bill Churchville – trumpet, flugelhorn, lead trumpet (5, 10, 11), flugelhorn solo (12), trumpet solo (13), backing vocals 
 Jesse McGuire – lead trumpet, trumpet solo (5, 9), backing vocals, band introduction 

Horn arrangements
 Greg Adams (1-4, 6, 8-14)
 Barry Danielian (5, 7)
 David Mann (5, 7)
 Dave Eskridge (15)

Production 
 Emilio Castillo – producer 
 Biff Dawes – recording (1, 3, 4, 5, 7, 8, 11-15)
 Tom Flye – recording (2, 6, 9, 10)
 Clarke Rigsby – additional recording, mixing 
 Doug Field – recording assistant (1, 3, 4, 5, 7, 8, 11-15)
 Phil Kneebone – recording assistant (1, 3, 4, 5, 7, 8, 11-15)
 Chuck Orozcko – recording assistant (2, 6, 9, 10)
 Scott Peets – recording assistant (2, 6, 9, 10)
 Vlado Meller – mastering at Sony Music Studios (New York City, New York)
 Michael Caplan – A&R 
 Ari Kast – packaging manager 
 Josh Cheuse – design 
 Joe Newton – illustrations
 Eric Camden – photography 
 Bret Lopez – photography 
 Stephen Moore – production director 
 Jack Hylan – tour manager 
 Louis Lind – tour manager 
 Gerald McCarthy – stage crew, setup
 Nico Vonk – monitor mix engineer

References 

Tower of Power albums
1999 live albums